Baltic Station is the main railway station in Tallinn, Estonia, and the largest railway station in Estonia. All local commuter, long-distance and international trains depart from the station.

Balti jaam is located in central Tallinn, and is situated immediately northwest of the city's Old town. It stands close to a large market called the Baltic Station Market.

The first station opened in 1870 when a railway line connecting Saint Petersburg with Paldiski via Tallinn was opened. The station was completely reconstructed between 1960–1966, and in 2005, the station building was completely renewed.

History
The first main building was completed in 1870. It was a two-storey building constructed from limestone with tower-like extrusions. 

During the 1 December 1924 communist coup d'état attempt in Estonia, Karl Kark, the then Minister of Transportation was assassinated by gunshot by pro-Soviet insurgents at the Tallinn Baltic Station. 

During World War II in 1941, the station building was set on fire by the Soviet Red Army. Shortly after the war, in 1945, the building was partially renovated. During 1960–1966, the station was completely reconstructed. Since the 1990s, the commuter trains 20x20m waiting pavilion has been used as a market. In 2005, the station building was completely renewed and Hotel Shnelli and the headquarters of Estonian Railways were completed nearby.

Layout
The station has seven platforms, of which two are situated apart from the rest and have been serving the international Tallinn–Moscow and Tallinn–Saint Petersburg routes performed by GoRail, and Elron's long-distance route to Viljandi. Platforms closer to the station building are mostly used by the commuter trains or long-distance routes to Tartu or Narva.

Gallery

See also
 List of railway stations in Estonia
 Rail transport in Estonia
 Ülemiste railway station

References

Tallinn Encyclopedia (part I), 2004. Page 30. .

External links
Official website

Railway stations in Estonia
Transport in Tallinn
Railway stations opened in 1870
1870s establishments in Estonia
Buildings and structures in Tallinn

